Setsucon is an annual two day anime convention held during January at the Blair County Convention Center in Altoona, Pennsylvania. The convention's name comes from the Japanese word setsu, meaning "snow". It is organized by the Penn State Anime Organization (PSAO). The convention is family-friendly.

Programming
The convention typically offers an anime music video contest, anime showings, artist alley, card-game tournaments, dance, dealer's room, Iron Cosplay, Itasha car show, manga library, masquerade, musical events, panels, tabletop gaming, video gaming, and workshops. The 2008 host auction raised $1,200 and was donated to the United Way. Todd Haberkorn participated in the 2013 host auction, raising $510 for charity. The host auction in 2014 raised nearly $500 for Child's Play. Richard Epcar and Stephanie Sheh participated in the 2015 host auction, along with several cosplayers, raising $800 for Child's Play. Setsucon in 2018 had over 130 hours of convention programming. The 2022 charity video game tournaments benefited the National Alliance on Mental Illness. Charities the convention supported in 2023 were the Colon Cancer Coalition and Jared Box.

History
Due to financial issues, the convention's first year in 2007 was reduced from three days to one day. In 2008, the convention expanded to two days due to additional funding. In 2010 on Saturday, Setsucon reached its venues capacity limit of 900 people before noon. The artists' alley and dealers' room were expanded in 2014. The dance was shut down early in 2015 because of complaints including poor behavior. In 2017, the convention showed never before seen clips from anime licensor Pied Piper, Inc. of the dub for Skip Beat!. In 2018, the convention moved to the Blair County Convention Center in Altoona, Pennsylvania. 

Setsucon due to the COVID-19 pandemic was scheduled to move to April for 2021, and would also have Friday programming. Instead, Setsucon held a virtual event in April, and in 2022 returned to January with a three day event. The 2022 convention had COVID-19 protocols including masking and vaccination/testing requirements.

Event History

Associations
Setsucon is a member of the International Otaku Expo Association (I.O.E.A).

Setsucon has sponsored a Costume Contest at Schlow Centre Region Library's BookFestPA event, run during the Central Pennsylvania Festival of the Arts.

References

Other Related News Articles
Anime enthusiasts gather Setsucon convention wraps up today Altoona Mirror, Retrieved 17 February 2018
'Setsucon' anime convention brings Japanese culture to Central PA WJAC, Retrieved 4 February 2020
Anime convention coming to Altoona this weekend WJAC, Retrieved 23 January 2021

External links
 Setsucon Website

Anime conventions in the United States
Recurring events established in 2007
2007 establishments in Pennsylvania
Annual events in Pennsylvania
Festivals in Pennsylvania
Pennsylvania culture
Tourist attractions in Blair County, Pennsylvania
Pennsylvania State University
Conventions in Pennsylvania